Joachim Thiel (born 7 August 1951) is a former professional German footballer.

Thiel made a total of 22 appearances in the Fußball-Bundesliga for Tennis Borussia Berlin during his playing career.

References 
 

1951 births
Living people
German footballers
Association football defenders
Bundesliga players
2. Bundesliga players
Tennis Borussia Berlin players
Wacker 04 Berlin players